Westinghouse Electronics LLC is a Chinese-owned American company that manufactures LCD televisions located in Diamond Bar, California.

It is a licensee of the way Westinghouse Licensing Corporation, commonly known as Westinghouse Electric Corporation.

History
In 2010, Westinghouse Digital stated on its LinkedIn page that it had ceased operations.  The brand was then acquired by Chinese company Tsinghua TongFang, who manufactures products under the Westinghouse Electronics brand.

In 2012, Westinghouse Electronics announced one of the first ultra high definition televisions featuring 4K resolutions.

Notes

External links
 

American brands
Westinghouse Electric Company
Consumer electronics brands
Display technology companies
Manufacturing companies based in Greater Los Angeles
American subsidiaries of foreign companies
Diamond Bar, California
Electronics companies of the United States
Companies based in Los Angeles County, California
American companies established in 2010
Electronics companies established in 2010
2010 establishments in California